Asura rubricosa is a moth of the family Erebidae. It is found in India and Sri Lanka.

Description
Forewings with broad cell. Antennae of male ciliated. Forewings with a series of postmedial blotches conjoined into a band, more irregular and without spots beyond it. The medial band is widely separated from the antemedial band. Hindwings pinkish, some specimen possess traces of a medial band.

References

rubricosa
Moths described in 1878
Moths of Asia
Moths of Sri Lanka